King Kong (better known as King Kong Encounter and also known as Kongfrontation during opening and King Kong: The Ride) was an attraction formerly part of the Studio Tour at Universal Studios Hollywood in Los Angeles. The attraction was based on the 1976 King Kong film and served as a basis for a stand-alone Kongfrontation, a former attraction at Universal Studios Florida. The scene, located amongst the New York Street backlot sets in the heart of the studios, was destroyed in the 2008 Universal Studios fire and was replaced by King Kong: 360 3-D, which was opened on July 1, 2010.

Summary

1986 version
The show began as the tour tram entered the soundstage into a world of New York City where they stopped in front of an apartment building facade. Guests watched a breaking news report about Kong's rampage on television monitors located inside of the building's windows showing live coverage of the destruction and it showed footage from ABC News, anchored by Sander Vanocur, of King Kong on the loose in the city. The giant ape was destroying the city, including throwing two elevated trains off the platforms of the rail track. New York City Police Department (NYPD) authorities could do nothing to stop him who was heading towards the Brooklyn Bridge. 

A news chopper that carried reporter Kelly King (portrayed by Sheree J. Wilson) was circling overhead and covering the story when Kong suddenly swatted at the chopper, causing it to come crashing down from above and exploding only a few feet away from the tram. As the tram rounded a corner, it drove out onto the Brooklyn Bridge, putting guests at eye-level with the giant animatronic ape. An NYPD helicopter fired upon Kong to protect the tram, but this enraged the beast who then shook the bridge and ripped the suspension bridge cables apart in an attempt to grab the tram. Miraculously, guests managed to escape the clutches of Kong as the tram exited the soundstage just in the nick of time.

1990 version
The show began as the tour tram entered the soundstage into a world of New York City where they stopped in front of an apartment building facade. Guests watched a breaking news report about Kong's rampage on television monitors located inside of the building's windows showing live coverage of the destruction and it showed footage from WWOR-TV, anchored by Rolland Smith, of King Kong on the loose in the city. The giant ape was destroying the city, including throwing two elevated trains off the platforms of the rail track. New York City Police Department (NYPD) authorities could do nothing to stop him who was heading towards the Brooklyn Bridge. 

A news chopper that carried reporter Kelly King (dubbed by Tress MacNeille) was circling overhead and covering the story when Kong suddenly swatted at the chopper, causing it to come crashing down from above and exploding only a few feet away from the tram. As the tram rounded a corner, it drove out onto the Brooklyn Bridge, putting guests at eye-level with the giant animatronic ape. An NYPD helicopter fired upon Kong to protect the tram, but this enraged the beast who then shook the bridge and ripped the suspension bridge cables apart in an attempt to grab the tram. Miraculously, guests managed to escape the clutches of Kong as the tram exited the soundstage just in the nick of time.

Mechanics and inspirations

The 7-ton, 30-foot-tall Kong figure in the attraction was the largest and most complex animatronic figure in existence for many years. Kong was designed by legendary Disney Imagineer Bob Gurr. The detailing was so rich that Kong even had banana-scented breath. The attraction broke new ground and paved the way for the complex themed attractions of today and was the inspiration behind the former Kongfrontation attraction at Universal Studios Florida. The Kong sequence was also featured in the film The Wizard starring Fred Savage and Christian Slater.

History

Universal Studios Tour began building its $7-million, computer-controlled, 30-foot animated King Kong in December 1985 to be housed in his own lower-lot studio that duplicated Lower East Side New York. The attraction opened on June 14, 1986 and was completely destroyed by a fire in the early morning of June 1, 2008. As of June 3, 2008 Universal Studios Officials had stated that the experience would not be rebuilt, but would instead be replaced by a new contemporary attraction. This had caused outrage among fans of the giant ape, which prompted Universal's decision to bring Kong back to the tour in the form of an all new 3D film experience. Following the loss of Kong, the Earthquake tour scene is featured more often in Universal Studios Hollywood promotional materials and the Collapsing Bridge tour scene was reopened.

Timeline of the attraction
1933 – King Kong (Merian C. Cooper) is released with Willis O’Brien as special effects chief technician.
1976 – King Kong (John Guillermin) is released, and provides the inspiration for this attraction.
1984 – Work starts on the attraction at Landmark Entertainment.
October 1985 – Sequoia Creative starts work on the Kong figure.
March 18, 1986 – Attraction previews at Universal Studios Hollywood.
June 14, 1986 – Public opening at Universal Studios Hollywood.
Late 1986 – MCA (Universal's parent company) takes control of WOR-TV in Secaucus, New Jersey and renames it WWOR-TV.
Early 1987 – Kelly's voice is dubbed by Tress MacNeille.
February 1, 1990 – News video footage re-made with WWOR news anchor Rolland Smith at the station's studios in Secaucus.
1990 – Attraction opens as Kongfrontation at Universal Studios Florida.
September 8, 2002 – Kongfrontation closes in Florida to make room for their version of Revenge of the Mummy dark ride.
2005 – King Kong by Peter Jackson is released.
June 1, 2008 – The entire King Kong attraction is destroyed in the 2008 Universal fire. Only the outer walls of the show building remained. A few days later, they had been demolished too.
July 1, 2010 – The entire King Kong Encounter attraction is replaced with King Kong: 360 3-D.

References

External links

King Kong (franchise)
Amusement rides introduced in 1986
Universal Studios Hollywood
Universal Parks & Resorts attractions by name
Amusement rides based on film franchises
Animatronic attractions
2008 fires in the United States
Former Universal Studios Hollywood attractions
1986 establishments in California
2008 disestablishments in California